Black Seeds of Vengeance is the second album by American technical death metal band Nile, released on September 5, 2000 through Relapse Records. It was the first album in Nile's discography to mark a more complex musical direction, as well as feature extensive liner notes in the booklet, written by Karl Sanders to explain the concept and themes behind each song. It also was the band's first album recorded with vocalist/guitarist Dallas Toler-Wade (who performed with the band until 2017), and features Derek Roddy as a session drummer, temporarily replacing previous drummer Pete Hammoura who left the band due to injuries sustained while touring. Bassist Chief Spires left shortly after touring for the album.

Critical reception and legacy

Sean Palmerston of Exclaim! called the album "some of the most brutal American death metal to ever be released" and said it was one of the top five metal releases of the year.

In 2020, it was named one of the 20 best metal albums of 2000 by Metal Hammer magazine.

In another issue of Metal Hammer,  founding member Karl Sanders described the album as a "terrible fucking mix", but when asked about the album's retrospective he said "it touched people. They were able to get something they wanted from it, which I believe is the songs, the violence, the energy, the darkness of it. That’s what matters. This record is far from perfect, but there is a vibe to it… there’s a definite violence. If I had to choose between violence and evil or technical perfection, I choose violence and evil!”

Track listing

Personnel
 Karl Sanders - guitars, vocals, keyboards
 Dallas Toler-Wade - guitars, vocals
 Chief Spires - bass, vocals
 Derek Roddy - drums, vocals
Additional Musicians
 Pete Hammoura - vocals, drums on "To Dream of Ur"
 Boz Porter - vocals on "Defiling the Gates of Ishtar"
 Mostafa Abd el Aziz - Arghul on "Invocation of the Gate of Aat-Ankh-es-en-Amenti"
 Ross Dolan - vocals on "Khetti Satha Shemsu"
 Gary Jones - vocals on "Defiling the Gates of Ishtar", "Masturbating the War God" and "Khetti Satha Shemsu"
 Bob Moore - vocals on "Khetti Satha Shemsu"
 Aly et Maher el Helbney - respirations on "The Nameless City of the Accursed"
 Scott Wilson - lead vocals on "To Dream of Ur", backing vocals on "Khetti Satha Shemsu"
 Mohammed el Hebney - additional vocals on "Khetti Satha Shemsu"
Production
 Bob Moore - engineering, mixing, producer
 Wes Benscoter - cover art
 Dave Shirk - mastering
 Karl Sanders - producer
 Adam Peterson - graphics, imagery

References 

Nile (band) albums
2000 albums
Relapse Records albums
Albums with cover art by Wes Benscoter